Ernst Behm (4 January 1830 – 15 March 1884) was a German geographer and statistician who was a native of Gotha.

After leaving the Ernestine Gymnasium, Gotha, Behm studied medicine and sciences at the Universities of Jena, Berlin and Würzburg. In 1856 he began work at Petermanns Geographischen Mitteilungen in Gotha, a German language journal of geography founded by August Heinrich Petermann (1822-1878).

In 1866 he became editor of Geographische Jahrbuch (Geographic Annals, (bd. 1-66, 1866-1983), and from 1872, with Hermann Wagner (1840–1929), edited the geographical/statistical review, Die Bevölkerung der Erde. Starting in 1876 he headed the editorial staff of the statistical section of the Gothaischen Hofkalenders, and in 1878, following the death of Petermann, he became editor of Petermanns Geographischen Mitteilungen.

In 1872 Behm published an article (Beweise für die Identität des Lualaba mit dem Congo), which scientifically demonstrated that the Lualaba was a headstream of the Congo River. This claim was later confirmed as factual by explorer Henry Morton Stanley in 1877.

References 
 This article is based on a translation of an article from the German Wikipedia, which cites Allgemeine Deutsche Biographie (ADB), vol. 46, (Leipzig: Duncker & Humblot, 1902), p. 335

External links

1830 births
1884 deaths
People from Gotha (town)
People from Saxe-Coburg and Gotha
German geographers
German statisticians